Metroland is the seventh soundtrack album by British singer-songwriter and guitarist Mark Knopfler, released on 23 March 1999 by Vertigo Records internationally and Warner Bros. Records in the United States. The album contains music composed for the 1997 film Metroland, directed by Philip Saville.

Composition
The instrumental tracks, specifically composed and recorded for the film by Knopfler, effectively help to create the mood and highlight the distinct personalities of the principal characters, with the soundtrack changing the atmosphere as the film flips back and forth between Paris in the early '60s and suburban London in 1977. Parisian flavour is augmented by the music of Françoise Hardy, Django Reinhardt and Quintette du Hot Club de France, with some late-70s classics from The Stranglers, Dire Straits, Hot Chocolate and Elvis Costello that are appropriate for that the period.

In the lyrics of "Metroland", the only song he wrote for the movie, Knopfler says "I've danced in the rain and I've been Django", so it is entirely appropriate that music by Django Reinhardt should also be on the soundtrack. The song is illustrative of Knopfler's art: it begins with a rising four-note theme on flugelhorn which parallels the hymn Jerusalem, the quintessential anthem of Englishness, but with a vibraphone accompaniment recalling Anglo-French jazz of the '50s. The same theme has been used throughout the movie as the protagonist's signature. The song then moves from a conventional verse backed by acoustic guitars into an electric guitar and organ-driven rock song, sweeping the listener along in its accelerating rush. Knopfler skillfully manipulates the dynamics to take the listener along an emotional journey, mimicking the film's protagonist's journey from detached observer to painfully involved main character.

Critical reception

The soundtrack generated generally positive reviews. In his review for AllMusic, Chuck Donkers gave the album three out of five stars, noting that Knopfler's music "nicely evokes the picture's wistful, nostalgic atmosphere." In his review in the Los Angeles Times, Kevin Thomas noted Knopfler's "evocative score". In her review for The New York Times, Janet Maslin noted that one of the film's "strongest assets" was Knopfler's "fine, expressive score". In her review in Boxoffice Magazine, Susan Green wrote, "This is a thoroughly satisfying little film with an exquisite Mark Knopfler score." In her review for iF Magazine, Etana Jacobson wrote that "Mark Knopfler's quirky Franco-Brit score adds without distracting." In his review for KillerMovies, Scott Renshaw wrote, "There's some nice atmosphere to Metroland, particularly from Mark Knopfler's silky score."

Track listing
All music was written and performed by Mark Knopfler, except where indicated.

Personnel
Music (tracks 1, 2, 4, 6-8, 14 only)
 Mark Knopfler – guitars, vocals
 Richard Bennett – guitars
 Jim Cox – piano, Hammond organ
 Guy Fletcher – keyboards
 Chris White – saxophones, flute
 Steve Sidwell – trumpet, flugelhorn
 Glenn Worf – bass
 Chad Cromwell – drums

Production
 Mark Knopfler – producer
 Chuck Ainlay – producer
 Andrew Gallimore – assistant producer
 Denny Purcell – mastering at Georgetown Masters in Nashville
 Jonathan Russell – mastering assistant
 Don Cobb – digital editing
 Rick Lecoat – design
 Mark Leialoha – photography (Mark Knopfler)
 Peter Mountain – photography (film stills)

References

External links
 Metroland at Mark Knopfler official website
 

1999 soundtrack albums
Albums produced by Chuck Ainlay
Albums produced by Mark Knopfler
Mark Knopfler soundtracks
Comedy film soundtracks
Drama film soundtracks
1990s film soundtrack albums